The 1951–52 season was Mansfield Town's 14th season in the Football League and tenth season in the Third Division North, they finished in 6th position with 52 points.

Final league table

Results

Football League Third Division North

FA Cup

Squad statistics
 Squad list sourced from

References
General
 Mansfield Town 1951–52 at soccerbase.com (use drop down list to select relevant season)

Specific

Mansfield Town F.C. seasons
Mansfield Town